Wilhelm Heinrich Walter Baade (March 24, 1893 – June 25, 1960) was a German astronomer who worked in the United States from 1931 to 1959.

Biography 
The son of a teacher, Baade finished school in 1912. He then studied maths, physics and astronomy at the universities of Münster and Göttingen. After receiving his PhD in 1919, Baade worked at Hamburg Observatory at Bergedorf from 1919 to 1931. There in 1920 he discovered 944 Hidalgo, the first of a class of minor planets now called Centaurs which cross the orbits of giant planets.

He worked at Mount Wilson Observatory from 1931 to 1958. There, during World War II, he took advantage of wartime blackout conditions (which reduced light pollution), to resolve stars in the center of the Andromeda Galaxy for the first time. These observations led him to define distinct "populations" for stars (Population I and Population II). The same observations led him to discover that there are two types of Cepheid variable stars. Using this discovery he recalculated the size of the known universe, doubling the previous calculation made by Edwin Hubble in 1929. He announced this finding to considerable astonishment at the 1952 meeting of the International Astronomical Union in Rome.

Together with Fritz Zwicky, he identified supernovae as a new category of astronomical objects. Zwicky and he also proposed the existence of neutron stars, and suggested supernovae might create them.

Beginning in 1952, he and Rudolph Minkowski identified the optical counterparts of various radio sources, including Cygnus A. He discovered 10 asteroids, including 944 Hidalgo, which has a long orbital period (it is actually the first centaur ever discovered, although they were not recognized as a distinct dynamical class until 1977); the Apollo-class 1566 Icarus, the perihelion of which is closer than that of Mercury; and the Amor-type 1036 Ganymed.

Honors 

Awards
Foreign membership of the Royal Netherlands Academy of Arts and Sciences (1953)
Elected Member of the American Philosophical Society (1953).
Gold Medal of the Royal Astronomical Society (1954)
Bruce Medal (1955)
Henry Norris Russell Lectureship of the American Astronomical Society (1958)
Named after him
Asteroid 1501 Baade
The crater Baade on the Moon
Vallis Baade, a vallis (valley) on the Moon
One of the two Magellan telescopes
The asteroid 966 Muschi, after his wife's nickname

See also 
 Baade's Window, an observational area he identified in the 1940s as being relatively free of dust that presents a view of the Galactic Center in Sagittarius
 Baade's Star, now known as the Crab Pulsar, was first identified as being directly associated with the Crab Nebula by him.

References

Further reading

External links
 Bruce Medal page
 Awarding of Bruce Medal
 Awarding of RAS gold medal

Obituaries
 JRASC 55 (1961) 113
 MitAG 14 (1961) 5
 QJRAS 2 (1961) 118

1893 births
1960 deaths
20th-century German astronomers
German emigrants to the United States
Discoverers of asteroids

Members of the Royal Netherlands Academy of Arts and Sciences
Recipients of the Bruce Medal
Recipients of the Gold Medal of the Royal Astronomical Society
Members of the Göttingen Academy of Sciences and Humanities
Academic staff of the University of Hamburg
Members of the American Philosophical Society